Tsat, also known as Utsat, Utset, Hainan Cham, or Huíhuī, is a tonal language spoken by 4,500 Utsul people in Yanglan and Huixin villages near Sanya, Hainan, China. Tsat is a member of the Malayo-Polynesian group within the Austronesian language family, and is one of the Chamic languages originating on the coast of present-day Vietnam.

Tonogenesis
Hainan Cham tones correspond to various Proto-Chamic sounds.

History 
Unusually for an Austronesian language, Tsat has developed into a tonal language, probably as a result of areal linguistic effects and contact with the diverse tonal languages spoken on Hainan including varieties of Chinese such as Hainanese and Standard Chinese, Tai–Kadai languages such as the Hlai languages, and Hmong–Mien languages such as Kim Mun.

Notes

References

External links
 
Recent papers on Tsat

Hainan
Languages of China
Chamic languages
Tonal languages in non-tonal families